George St George may refer to:
 Sir George St George (1583−1660), Irish MP, Vice-Admiral of Connaught
 Sir George St George (Carrick MP) (fl. 1640–1713), Irish politician, MP for Carrick
 George St George, 1st Baron Saint George (c. 1658–1735), Irish politician, MP for County Roscommon, 1692–1715
 George St George (Athlone MP) (1682–1762), Irish politician, MP for Athlone
 St George St George, 1st Baron Saint George (c. 1715–1775), Irish politician, MP for Carrick from 1741, grandson of the previous Baron Saint George
 George Saint-George (1841–1924), British musical instrument maker and composer